This is a list of the best-selling hip-hop albums in the United States in the year 2010 based on RIAA certification and Nielsen SoundScan sales tracking.

Best-selling hip-hop albums by year

References

United States, Hip hop albums, 2010s
American music-related lists
2010s in American music
United States, 2010s